Mary T. Washburn (August 4, 1907 - February 2, 1994) was an American athlete who competed mainly in the sprints.

She attended DePauw University, graduating in 1928. She also graduated from NYU in 1929.

She competed for the United States in the 1928 Summer Olympics held in Amsterdam, Netherlands in the 4 x 100 metres where she won the Silver medal with her team mates Jessie Cross, Loretta McNeil and Betty Robinson.

References

1907 births
1994 deaths
American female sprinters
Athletes (track and field) at the 1928 Summer Olympics
Olympic silver medalists for the United States in track and field
DePauw University alumni
New York University alumni
Medalists at the 1928 Summer Olympics
20th-century American women
Olympic female sprinters